Like all municipalities of Puerto Rico, Cataño is subdivided into administrative units called barrios, which are roughly comparable to minor civil divisions. The barrios and subbarrios, in turn, are further subdivided into smaller local populated place areas/units called  (sectors in English). The types of sectores may vary, from normally sector to urbanización to reparto to barriada to residencial, among others. Some sectors appear in two barrios.

List of sectors by barrio

Cataño barrio-pueblo

Streets:

Palmas

See also

 List of communities in Puerto Rico

References

Cataño
Cataño